Tõnis Seesmaa (born 3 October 1955) is an Estonian politician and engineer. He was an alternate member of VIII Riigikogu, representing the Estonian Coalition Party.

He was born in Tartu and graduated with a degree as a forestry engineer from the Estonian Agricultural University in 1979.

References

Living people
1955 births
Estonian Coalition Party politicians
Members of the Riigikogu, 1995–1999
Estonian University of Life Sciences alumni
Politicians from Tartu